Beyond Hypothermia is a compilation by Cave In, compiling material from early out-of-print releases, and released in February 1998 on Hydra Head Records.

Track listing

Personnel 
Cave In
The following list is of Cave In members during the time of recording of the original tracks. Most of the songs were re-recorded with different members for Beyond Hypothermia.
 Stephen Brodsky – guitar
 John-Robert Conners – drums
 Jay Frechette – vocals (tracks 1–2)
 Justin Matthes – bass guitar (tracks 1–8)
 Adam McGrath – guitar
 Dave Scrod – vocals (tracks 3–10)

Production and recording history
 Kurt Ballou – Beyond Hypothermia production
 Cave In – Beyond Hypothermia production
 Tracks 6, 8 recorded at Salad Days Studio with Brian McTernan in December 1995
 Tracks 4, 5, 7 recorded at Salad Days Studio with Brian McTernan in April 1996
 Tracks 1, 2, 3 recorded at Salad Days Studio with Brian McTernan in January–February 1996
 Tracks 9, 10 recorded Bernard Studio in November 1997

Art and design
 Jacob Bannon – visuals, design
 Adam McGrath – cover video still
 Todd Pollack – live photography

References 

Cave In albums
Albums produced by Kurt Ballou
Albums with cover art by Jacob Bannon
1998 compilation albums
Hydra Head Records compilation albums
Albums produced by Brian McTernan